Stephen Paul Dooley (born 19 October 1991) is a Northern Irish professional footballer who plays for English club Harrogate Town, as a winger.

Early and personal life
Born in Ballymoney, Dooley grew up in Portstewart and attended Loreto College, Coleraine.

Club career
Dooley began his career with Coleraine. He left in 2010 to play college soccer in the United States for the Loyola Greyhounds. He returned to Coleraine in 2013. He signed for Derry City in January 2014, before moving to Cork City in January 2016. He returned to Coleraine for a third spell in December 2017.

He signed for English club Rochdale in May 2018. On 19 June 2021, Dooley signed a new one-year contract.

On 14 June 2022, it was announced that Dooley would move to fellow League Two club Harrogate Town on a two-year deal, at the end of his current contract with Rochdale.

International career
Dooley represented Northern Ireland at under-17 and under-19 levels.

References

1991 births
Living people
People from Ballymoney
Association footballers from Northern Ireland
Association football wingers
Northern Ireland youth international footballers
Coleraine F.C. players
Loyola Greyhounds men's soccer players
Derry City F.C. players
Cork City F.C. players
Rochdale A.F.C. players
Harrogate Town A.F.C. players
NIFL Premiership players
League of Ireland players
English Football League players
Expatriate association footballers from Northern Ireland
Expatriates from Northern Ireland in the Republic of Ireland
Expatriate association footballers in the Republic of Ireland
Expatriates from Northern Ireland in the United States
Expatriate soccer players in the United States
Expatriate footballers in England